KCUZ (1490 AM) is a radio station licensed to Clifton, Arizona, US. The station is owned by Cochise Broadcasting LLC.

References

External links
 FCC History Cards for KCUZ

CUZ